Alexander Hamilton Main (June 22, 1824 – January 9, 1896) was an American businessman and politician.

Born in Plainfield, New York, Main owned a store in Allegany County, New York. In 1856, Main served in the New York State Assembly, as a Republican. Main then moved to Madison, Wisconsin, in 1856, where he worked in a bank and then owned an insurance business and was president of Wisconsin Board of Underwriters. Main was also a curator of the Wisconsin Historical Society and served as the society's treasurer. He died in Madison, Wisconsin. His brother was Willett Main, who served in the Wisconsin State Senate.

References

External links

1824 births
1896 deaths
Politicians from Madison, Wisconsin
People from Plainfield, New York
Businesspeople from New York (state)
Businesspeople from Madison, Wisconsin
Wisconsin Republicans
Republican Party members of the New York State Assembly
19th-century American politicians
19th-century American businesspeople